Raúl Humberto Soto Mardones (born 20 November 1987) is a Chilean lawyer and politician who served as President of the Chamber of Deputies of Chile in 2022.

References 

University of Chile alumni
21st-century Chilean lawyers
Christian Democratic Party (Chile) politicians
Party for Democracy (Chile) politicians
1987 births
Presidents of the Chamber of Deputies of Chile
Living people